Nilesh Sahay is an Indian Film Producer, Writer and Director.

Sahay made his film debut in Ganesh Acharaya's 2011 film Angel.  He later turned film maker/ producer and started shooting Squad, his directorial debut, in september 2019 at Belarusfilm studios in Minsk.

Family
Sahay is the son of the actress Zaheeda. His great-grandmother Jaddan Bai, was the country's first female film producer and music composer. His grandfather Aktar Hussain was an actor, producer, director and writer and his grandaunt and uncle Nargis Dutt and Sunil Dutt were also actors. Sahay is also the nephew of Bollywood actor Sanjay Dutt.

References

External links
 

Living people
1983 births
Male actors in Hindi cinema
Male actors from Mumbai
21st-century Indian male actors